The 1952-53 Segunda División de México season was the third tournament in this competition. Initially it counted with the participation of 13 teams, however, after Match 20 Cuautla was disqualified due to undue alignment and other irregularities. Toluca was the winner.

Teams

League standings

Results

Moves
Toluca was promoted to First Division.
La Piedad was relegated from First Division.
Veracruz was dissolved after this season
Cuautla re-joined in next season.
C.D. Anáhuac and Oviedo de Pachuca new expansion teams.

References

Mex
1952–53 in Mexican football
Segunda División de México seasons